The 1993 U.S. Women's Open was the 48th U.S. Women's Open, held July 22–25 at Crooked Stick Golf Club in Carmel, Indiana, a suburb north of Indianapolis. Five strokes back after three rounds, Lauri Merten fired a 68 (−4) to win her only major title, one stroke ahead of runners-up Donna Andrews and Helen Alfredsson, the 54-hole leader.

This Open set a record for sup-par rounds at 89; the previous record was 66 in 1988. Only nine rounds were under par on Sunday.

Two years earlier, Crooked Stick was the venue for the PGA Championship, won by John Daly.  It later hosted the Solheim Cup matches in 2005, won by the United States.

Past champions in the field

Made the cut

Source:

Missed the cut

Source:

Round summaries

First round
Friday, July 22, 1993

Source:

Second round
Friday, July 23, 1993

Source:

Third round
Saturday, July 24, 1993

Source:

Final round
Sunday, July 25, 1993

Source:

References

External links
U.S. Women's Open - past champions - 1993

U.S. Women's Open
Golf in Indiana
Sports competitions in Indiana
Carmel, Indiana
Women's sports in Indiana
U.S. Women's Open
U.S. Women's Open
U.S. Women's Open
U.S. Women's Open